The Velasco IV Cabinet constituted the 16th cabinet of the  Bolivian Republic. It was formed on 4 February 1848, 17 days after José Miguel de Velasco was reinstalled) as the 4th president of Bolivia following a coup d'état, succeeding the Guilarte Cabinet. It was dissolved on 16 October 1848 when acting president José María Linares merged all ministerial portfolios into a singular General Secretariat and was succeeded by the Cabinet of Manuel Isidoro Belzu.

Composition

History 
Upon his assumption to office, Velasco charged all ministerial portfolios to Casimiro Olañeta as minister general pending the formation of a proper ministerial cabinet. A full council of ministers was appointed on 4 February 1848, 17 days into his mandate, composed of four ministers. In this cabinet, the portfolio of foreign affairs, which in 1842 had been transferred to the Ministry of Public Instruction, was returned to the Ministry of the Interior. In turn, a new post under the name of worship and tasked with religious affairs was attached to the public instruction post.

On 12 October 1848, faced with a rebellion by Manuel Isidoro Belzu, Velasco provisionally transferred command to José María Linares, the president of the Extraordinary Congress. Four days later, Linares appointed José María Calvimontes as minister general tasked with the dispatch of all ministerial administrations for the duration of the crisis. This effectively dissolved Velasco's cabinet on that date.

One future president, Manuel Isidoro Belzu (1848–1855) was a member of this cabinet.

Cabinets

References

Notes

Footnotes

Bibliography 

 

1848 establishments in Bolivia
1848 disestablishments in Bolivia
Cabinets of Bolivia
Cabinets established in 1848
Cabinets disestablished in 1848